Tony Miles (1955–2001) was an English chess Grandmaster.

Tony Miles or Anthony Miles may also refer to:

Tony Miles (Canadian football) (born 1978), former Canadian football player
Tony Miles (journalist) (1930–2018), former British newspaper editor
Tony Miles (poker player), American poker player
Anthony Miles (Australian footballer) (born 1992), Australian footballer for Gold Coast, formerly for GWS and Richmond
Anthony Miles (basketball) (born 1989), American basketball player